Terje Høsøien (born 14 February 1974) is a retired Norwegian football midfielder.

He played youth football for Strindheim and also won Norway international youth caps. In 1995 Strindheim contested the highest league, but was relegated.

Strindheim then languished in the Norwegian First Division, but Høsøien scored the winning goal when Strindheim shockingly eliminated Rosenborg from the 2000 Norwegian Football Cup. In 2001 he left Strindheim to return to the top tier, signing for Moss FK. In 2004 he returned to Strindheim as a key player, now on the third tier.

References

1974 births
Living people
Norwegian footballers
Norway youth international footballers
Footballers from Trondheim
Strindheim IL players
Moss FK players
Eliteserien players
Norwegian First Division players
Association football midfielders